Periodic abstinence may refer to:
The use of fertility awareness as birth control
Following the Roman Catholic Church's teachings on natural family planning